The dwarf alligator lizard (Abronia viridiflava), is a species of lizard in the family Anguidae. The species is endemic to Mexico.

References

Abronia
Reptiles described in 1873
Endemic reptiles of Mexico
Taxa named by Marie Firmin Bocourt